Thospia crassipalpella is a species of snout moth in the genus Thospia. It was described by Ragonot in 1888. It is found in Iran.

References

Moths described in 1888
Phycitini